Rhizanthella, commonly known as underground orchids, is a genus of flowering plants in the orchid family, Orchidaceae and is endemic to Australia. All are leafless, living underground in symbiosis with mycorrhizal fungi. The inflorescence is a head of flowers held at, or just above the ground but mostly covered by soil or leaf litter and little is known about the mechanism of pollination.

Description
Orchids in the genus Rhizanthella are mostly underground, perennial, sympodial, mycotrophic herbs with fleshy underground stems which produce new shoots at nodes where there are colourless leaf-like cataphylls. There are no roots and new tubers form at the end of short stems. The leaves are reduced to scale-like structures lacking chlorophyll, pressed against and sheathing the stems.

The inflorescence is a head containing many flowers and is held at, or just above ground level but the head is usually covered with leaf litter or soil. The head is surrounded by a large number of overlapping bracts and each flower has an erect, elongated bract at its base. The flowers are non-resupinate, arranged in a spiral, inward-facing, dull coloured and lack a stalk. The sepals and petals form a short, curved hood over the labellum and column, open on one side. The lateral sepals are joined to each other and to the dorsal sepal at their bases. The petals are joined at their bases to the column and are shorter than the sepals. The labellum is different in size, shape and colouration from the other petals and sepals, is thick, fleshy and has no nectar. The column is short with short wings. Flowering time depends on species and is followed by the fruit which is a berry that does not split open (indehiscent) and which contains 50 to 100 seeds.

Underground orchids do not possess chloroplasts but they retain plastid genes, although R. gardneri possesses the smallest organelle genome yet described in land plants.

Taxonomy and naming
The first formal description of an underground orchid was by Richard Sanders Rogers who published his description of R. gardneri in the Journal of the Royal Society of Western Australia in 1928. The name "Rhizanthella" is a diminutive of Rhizanthes, a parasitic plant in the Family Rafflesiaceae. The name "Rhizanthes" is derived from the Ancient Greek words rhiza meaning "root" and anthos meaning "flower".

Species list
Four species are recognised by the World Checklist of Selected Plant Families and a fifth species has been formally described, but not as yet accepted by other authorities:
 Rhizanthella gardneri R.S.Rogers – western underground orchid (W.A.)
 Rhizanthella johnstonii K.W.Dixon & Christenh.  – south coast underground orchid (W.A.)
 Rhizanthella omissa D.L.Jones & M.A.Clem. (Qld.)
 Rhizanthella slateri (Rupp) M.A.Clem. & P.J.Cribb – eastern Australian underground orchid (N.S.W.)

In 2020, a fifth species, Rhizanthella speciosa, found in New South Wales, was described by Mark Clements and David Jones in the journal Lankesteriana but as at September 2020, the name has not been accepted by the World Checklist of Selected Plant Families.

Distribution and habitat
Rhizanthella gardneri occurs in the south-west of Western Australia where it grows in association with broombush (Melaleuca uncinata). R. johnstonii, also from WA, was split from R. gardneri in 2018. Rhizanthella slateri, formerly known as Cryptanthemis slateri, occurs in the Blue Mountains and similar ranges in New South Wales where it grows in sclerophyll forest. R. speciosa was discovered in 2016 in wet sclerophyll forest in Barrington Tops, which contrasts with the more-open dry forest habitat of R. slateri.

Ecology
The pollination mechanism of Rhizanthella is not known. A single specimen of a small fly from the genus Megaselia, some small wasps and termites are the only observations of insects carrying pollinia of Rhizanthella.

References

Further reading
 Jones, David L. (2006). A complete guide to native orchids of Australia: including the island territories. Frenchs Forest. .
 Underground orchid - Rhizanthella gardneri at ARKive.org (includes photographs)
 

 
Diurideae genera
Endemic orchids of Australia
Myco-heterotrophic orchids